Iwno may refer to the following places in Poland:
Iwno, Lower Silesian Voivodeship (south-west Poland)
Iwno, Kuyavian-Pomeranian Voivodeship (north-central Poland)
Iwno, Greater Poland Voivodeship (west-central Poland)